Andrew Lin Hoi is a Hong Kong-based Taiwanese actor and visual artist. Originally working as a special effects makeup artist in the United States, he went to Hong Kong in 1996 where he started his acting career.

Filmography

Films

Television

References

External links 

Blog on Alivenotdead.com

1969 births
Living people
Taiwanese male film actors
Taiwanese male television actors
20th-century Taiwanese male actors
21st-century Taiwanese male actors
Taiwanese-born Hong Kong artists